The Olympics in Mexico is a 1969 Mexican documentary film directed by Alberto Isaac. It was nominated for an Academy Award for Best Documentary Feature. The film was preserved by the Academy Film Archive in 1999.

See also
1968 Summer Olympics

References

External links

1969 films
1960s Spanish-language films
Mexican documentary films
Documentary films about the Olympics
1969 documentary films
1960s sports films
Films about the 1968 Summer Olympics
1960s Mexican films